Anniyur may refer to:

 Anniyur, Viluppuram, Tamil Nadu, India
 Anniyur, Tiruvarur, Tamil Nadu, India